Siosateki Tonga was a politician from Tonga who served as 4th Prime Minister of Tonga from 1893 to January 1905. He was the first holder of the title Veikune which he got from George Tupou II in 1903.

References 

Prime Ministers of Tonga
Tongan politicians